The Multan Sultans is a franchise cricket team that represents Multan in the Pakistan Super League. The team made its PSL debut in the  2018 season.  The team finished 5th after group stage matches, winning only three out of their ten matches and failing to reach the play-offs for the second consecutive year.

Background
Multan Sultans are the sixth team to join the league. 2018 was their inaugural season.  After the league was started in 2016, this was the first expansion of the league. Tom Moody serves as their coach. Prior to the start of the fourth season, Schon Properties failed to pay the $5.2 million annual fee, and Pakistan Cricket Board had cancelled their franchise.. After the cancellation, the PCB took responsibility of all player and coach contracts while the public tender process took place to grant the repackaged rights of the team. The PCB asked interested bidders to collect the bidding documents from its offices by 14 December 2018. The financial proposal of the technically qualified bidders is due to be opened on 18 December 2018.  On 20 December 2018, PSL announced that Ali Tareen-led Multan consortium had won the franchise rights for the sixth team for a seven-year period, by exceeding the PCB's reserve price set at $5.21 million per year. Tareen's bid was for $6.35 million per year, making this the most expensive franchise.

Squad
Players with international caps are shown in bold
Ages are given as of the first match of the season, 14 February 2019

Points table

Season summary

Multan Sultans started their season against Karachi Kings with a close defeat by just 7 runs.  In the next game against Islamabad United they registered their first win after restricting the opponents to only 125 runs and managing to chase the target pretty easily. After their first five games, they lost 4 and won only once. They had their chance against Lahore Qalandars where they posted the highest total batting first of the tournament (200), but bad bowling in last few overs costed them the match, resulting in losing the match on the last ball.  They won their second match of the season against Islamabad United by 6 wickets.  Team's bad performance continued as they suffer three more loses, resulting in them being the first team to be eliminated from the season.

After playing ten matches, they managed to get over the line in three matches with the 3rd win coming against Lahore Qalandars in their final game of the season, played at National Stadium. As a result, They finished 5th on the points table  for the second consecutive year.

Skipper Shoaib Malik was team's leading runs-scorer with 266 runs, while Shahid Afridi with 10 wickets in 8 matches was team's leading wicket-taker for the season.

References

2019 in Punjab, Pakistan
2019 Pakistan Super League 
Sultans in 2019
2019